Boag's Brewery (J. Boag & Son) is an Australian brewery company founded in 1883 by James Boag and his son, also named James, in Launceston, Tasmania, Australia. It is now owned by Lion, a Trans-Tasman subsidiary company of Japanese beverage conglomerate, Kirin.  All of the company's beers are produced in Launceston.

History

19th century

James Boag I arrived in Australia with his wife, Janet, and their four children in 1853 from Scotland. After three months in the Victorian goldfields, they came to Tasmania.  After he and his son James Boag II left the Cornwall Brewery in 1878, James II went into partnership with John Glenwright at the Cataract Brewery an James I became the licensee of the All Year Round Hotel.

In 1881, the Esk Brewery was established on the banks of the North Esk River in Launceston by Charles Stammers Button. John Fawns died, and James Boag III was born.  In 1883, James I and his son took over the Esk Brewery. J. Boag & Son was officially formed in 1883, as the partnership between James Boag I and his son, to operate the brewery.  The company's initial output was seven hogsheads of beer weekly. The name 'Esk Brewery' was retained, although 'Boag's Brewery' became a frequent reference.

In 1887, James Boag II began management of the company on the retirement of his father. A new malthouse was built and weekly production had increased to more than 500 hogsheads, with the brewery employing a 30 members of staff.

In 1898, J. Boag & Son purchased the Cornwall Brewery and amalgamated it with the Esk Brewery; James Boag I died in 1890.

20th century
James Boag II died in 1919 and was succeeded by James Boag III who had been training at Tooth and Co.'s brewery in Sydney.

In 1924, James Boag III retired temporarily from the company, and returned in 1930 as Managing Director, a position he held until his death in 1944. His obituary in the Examiner reported: "Having been closely connected with business and sporting activities, Mr Boag was known and respected by a wide circle of friends. At the time of his death, he was Managing Director of J. Boag & Son Limited and a Director of Tasmanian Breweries Pty Limited."

George Boag, James III's second son, took over James' seat on the Board; he was the last Boag working in the business, retiring in 1976 after the death of his wife.

Since 2000

In 2000, San Miguel Corporation acquired J. Boag & Son (previously a publicly listed company) for $92 million. The existing Tasmanian management was retained to continue running the company; production had increased annually for the previous 3 years and this growth was planned to continue.

In 2004, Boag's Brewery was expanded to occupy the complete block enclosed by William, Tamar and Shield Streets and The Esplanade.

San Miguel sold J. Boag & Son to Lion Nathan Ltd in November 2007 for $325 million.

Beers

James Boag's Premium Lager – A European style pilsner, ABV 4.6% Launched in 1994.
Boag's Strongarm Bitter – An Australian Bitter Ale, ABV 5.2% Launched in 1997. Production Ceased 2008.
James Boag's Premium Light – A low alcohol European style pilsner, ABV 2.5%. Launched in 2002.
Boag's Draught – A traditional Australian style of lager, ABV 4.6%. Circa mid 1880s.
Boag's Draught Light – A low alcohol Australian style of lager, ABV 2.7%. Launched in 2004.
James Boag's Pure – A super premium made with 100% Tasmanian ingredients, ABV 4.5%. Launched in 2009 (Not currently in production)
Boag's Classic Blonde – A low carbohydrate style of lager, ABV 4.5%. Launched in 2007. Production ceased 2015.
Boag's Wizard Smith ale – A traditional English Pale Ale, ABV 5.0%. Launched in 2007. Only available in Tasmania.
Boag's XXX Ale – An Australian style Steam Ale. ABV 4.8%. Launched in 1881. Only available in Tasmania.  Colloquially referred to as 'Reds' or 'Strawberry Kisses' due to the colour of the can and the inclusion of three 'x's' in the title.
Boag's St George – A Californian style of lager, ABV 4.2%. Launched in 2004. Production Ceased 2011. Limited re-released for the Tasmanian market March 2019. On 2 October 2019 the brewery announced they would be bringing St.George back for good starting from 15 October 2019.
Boag's Honey Porter – A limited edition porter made with Tasmanian leatherwood honey (not currently in production).
James Boag's Wild Rivers – A Premium Australian Lager, ABV 4.2%. Launched in 2018 (not currently in Production).
 Boag's Bitter Beer – Not much is known about this beer, Alcohol volume of 4.9%. Ceased production around 1997. (Currently Not in Production)
 Boags 1881 Traditional Ale – A Tasmanian Style Ale made as close to the original recipe in 1881 with an alcohol volume of 5.5%. Currently Not in production (Limited Edition)
 Boags Classic Bitter – A Bitter Beer with an Alcohol Volume of 4.9%. Discontinued around 2008 (Currently not in production)
 Boags Original Bitter – Another Bitter beer with an Alcohol volume of 4.7%. Discontinued around 2005 (Currently not in production)
 Boags Export Lager – A Beer specifically for the International Market. With an Alcohol percentage of 5% and no information on when production ceased (Currently not in production)
 Boags TigerHead Bitter Beer – A light Beer from the early 80s. With an alcohol volume of 2.8% (not in production)

James Boag Brewery Experience

Opening in 1826 and originally named The Lame Dog Hotel; the building would go on to be known as The Golden Lion, The Prince Albert, The Prince Alfred, and finally The Tamar Hotel.  The building was bought buy The James Boag Brewery in the late 1990s; and restored to house the James Boag Brewery Experience (previously Boags Centre for Beer Lovers); from which the James Boag Brewery run daily tours, 7 days a week; as well as running a function center, cafe, and beer garden.

See also

Australian pub
Beer in Australia
Beer in Tasmania
List of breweries in Australia

References

Notes

Bibliography

External links
J Boag & Son
Boag's Draught
Boag's history at sportandhistory.com

Kirin Group
Australian beer brands
Food and drink companies established in 1883
Buildings and structures in Launceston, Tasmania
Culture of Tasmania
Beer brewing companies based in Tasmania
Tasmanian Heritage Register
Companies based in Tasmania
Australian companies established in 1883